The 1987–88 NBA season was the Hawks' 39th season in the NBA and 20th season in Atlanta, in the U.S. state of Georgia. The Hawks got off to a 6–5 start to the season, then won 16 of their next 18 games, and held a 30–15 record at the All-Star break. The team posted a 7-game winning streak between March and April, but then lost six of their final nine games, finishing third in the Central Division with a 50–32 record.

Dominique Wilkins averaged 30.7 points, 6.4 rebounds and 1.3 steals per game, and was named to the All-NBA Second Team, while Doc Rivers averaged 14.2 points, 9.3 assists and 1.8 steals per game. Wilkins and Rivers were both selected for the 1988 NBA All-Star Game, with head coach Mike Fratello coaching the Eastern Conference. In addition, Kevin Willis provided the team with 11.6 points and 7.3 rebounds per game, while Randy Wittman contributed 10.0 points and 3.7 assists per game, Cliff Levingston provided with 10.0 points and 6.1 rebounds per game, and Tree Rollins averaged 6.0 rebounds and led the team with 1.7 blocks per game. Off the bench, John Battle contributed 10.6 points per game, and Antoine Carr averaged 8.8 points and 3.6 rebounds per game.

In the Eastern Conference First Round of the playoffs, the Hawks defeated the Milwaukee Bucks in five games. In the Eastern Conference Semi-finals, they took a 3–2 series lead over Larry Bird and the top-seeded Boston Celtics. However, the Hawks would lose Game 6 at The Omni, 102–100, then lose Game 7 at the Boston Garden, 118–116, thus losing the series in seven games. This was the closest Wilkins had ever gotten to advancing to the Conference Finals. 

Following the season, Wittman was traded to the Sacramento Kings, and Rollins signed as a free agent with the Cleveland Cavaliers.

Draft picks

Roster

Regular season

Season standings

z - clinched division title
y - clinched division title
x - clinched playoff spot

Record vs. opponents

Game log

|- align="center" bgcolor="#ccffcc"
| 29 || January 5, 19888:00 PM EST || Detroit
| W 81–71
|
|
|
| The Omni16,451
| 22–7
|- align="center" bgcolor="#ffcccc"
| 30 || January 6, 19887:30 PM EST || @ Detroit
| L 87–90
|
|
|
| Pontiac Silverdome25,749
| 22–8
|- align="center" bgcolor="#ccffcc"
| 35 || January 16, 19881:30 PM EST || @ Dallas
| W 101–98
|
|
|
| Reunion Arena17,007
| 26–9
|- align="center" bgcolor="#ffcccc"
| 42 || January 29, 198810:30 PM EST || @ L.A. Lakers 
| L 107–117
| Rivers (27)
| Willis (12)
| Rivers (9)
| The Forum17,505
| 29–13

|- align="center" bgcolor="#ffcccc"
| 47 || February 12, 19888:00 PM EST || @ Detroit
| L 92–108
|
|
|
| Pontiac Silverdome35,884
| 31–16
|- align="center" bgcolor="#ffcccc"
| 51 || February 19, 19888:00 PM EST || L.A. Lakers 
| L 119–126 (OT) 
| Wilkins (38) 
| Levingston (16) 
| Rivers (15) 
| The Omni16,451 
| 32–19

|- align="center" bgcolor="#ffcccc"
| 56 || March 1, 19887:30 PM EST || Detroit
| L 104–117
|
|
|
| The Omni16,451
| 35–21
|- align="center" bgcolor="#ccffcc"
| 68 || March 29, 19888:00 PM EST || Dallas
| W 120–106
|
|
|
| The Omni14,583
| 42–26
|- align="center" bgcolor="#ccffcc"
| 69 || March 30, 19887:30 PM EST || @ Detroit
| W 103–102
|
|
|
| Pontiac Silverdome47,692
| 43–26

|- align="center" bgcolor="#ffcccc"
| 74 || April 9, 19887:30 PM EDT || Detroit
| L 102–115
|
|
|
| The Omni16,451
| 47–27
|-

Playoffs

|- align="center" bgcolor="#ccffcc"
| 1
| April 29
| Milwaukee
| W 110–107
| Dominique Wilkins (26)
| Kevin Willis (9)
| Doc Rivers (6)
| Omni Coliseum11,517
| 1–0
|- align="center" bgcolor="#ccffcc"
| 2
| May 1
| Milwaukee
| W 104–97
| Dominique Wilkins (43)
| Kevin Willis (10)
| Doc Rivers (8)
| Omni Coliseum11,777
| 2–0
|- align="center" bgcolor="#ffcccc"
| 3
| May 4
| @ Milwaukee
| L 115–123
| Dominique Wilkins (22)
| Dominique Wilkins (14)
| Randy Wittman (8)
| MECCA Arena11,052
| 2–1
|- align="center" bgcolor="#ffcccc"
| 4
| May 6
| @ Milwaukee
| L 99–105
| Dominique Wilkins (31)
| Kevin Willis (8)
| Doc Rivers (9)
| MECCA Arena11,052
| 2–2
|- align="center" bgcolor="#ccffcc"
| 5
| May 8
| Milwaukee
| W 121–111
| Dominique Wilkins (33)
| Dominique Wilkins (10)
| Doc Rivers (15)
| Omni Coliseum12,190
| 3–2
|-

|- align="center" bgcolor="#ffcccc"
| 1 || May 11 || @ Boston
| L 101–110
| Dominique Wilkins (25)
| Doc Rivers (9)
| three players tied (5)
| Boston Garden14,890
| 0–1
|- align="center" bgcolor="#ffcccc"
| 2 || May 13 || @ Boston
| L 97–108
| Dominique Wilkins (22)
| Tree Rollins (9)
| Doc Rivers (6)
| Boston Garden14,890
| 0–2
|- align="center" bgcolor="#ccffcc"
| 3 || May 15 || Boston
| W 110–92
| Dominique Wilkins (25)
| Kevin Willis (13)
| Spud Webb (13)
| Omni Coliseum16,451
| 1–2
|- align="center" bgcolor="#ccffcc"
| 4 || May 16 || Boston
| W 118–109
| Dominique Wilkins (40)
| Tree Rollins (12)
| Doc Rivers (22)
| Omni Coliseum16,451
| 2–2
|- align="center" bgcolor="#ccffcc"
| 5 || May 18 || @ Boston
| W 112–104
| Kevin Willis (27)
| Kevin Willis (14)
| Doc Rivers (7)
| Boston Garden14,890
| 3–2
|- align="center" bgcolor="#ffcccc"
| 6 || May 20 || Boston
| L 100–102
| Dominique Wilkins (35)
| Willis, Rollins (11)
| Spud Webb (7)
| Omni Coliseum16,451
| 3–3
|- align="center" bgcolor="#ffcccc"
| 7 || May 22 || @ Boston
| L 116–118
| Dominique Wilkins (47)
| Kevin Willis (11)
| Doc Rivers (18)
| Boston Garden14,890
| 3–4
|-

Player statistics

Season

Playoffs

Player Statistics Citation:

Awards and records
 Dominique Wilkins, All-NBA Second Team

Transactions

References

See also
 1987-88 NBA season

Atlanta Hawks seasons
Atlanta Haw
Atlanta Haw
Atlanta Hawks